The men's 110 metres hurdles at the 2022 Commonwealth Games, as part of the athletics programme, took place in the Alexander Stadium on 2 and 4 August 2022.

Records
Prior to this competition, the existing world and Games records were as follows:

Schedule
The schedule was as follows:

All times are British Summer Time (UTC+1)

Results

First round
The first round consisted of two heats. The three fastest competitors per heat (plus two fastest non-automatic qualifiers) advanced to the final.

Final
The medals were determined in the final.

References

Men's 110 metres hurdles
2018